The General Judicial System is the Danish juridical system in its entirety.

See also
 Danish courts of justice
 Police of Denmark (Politi)
 Danish Prosecution Service (Anklagemyndigheden)
 Danish Prison and Probation Service (Kriminalforsorgen)
 Civil Affairs Authority (Civilstyrelsen)
 Danish Data Protection Agency (Datatilsynet)

Law of Denmark
Law enforcement in Denmark